Goniaea angustipennis is a species of grasshopper in the family Acrididae.

References

angustipennis
Insects described in 1920
Taxa named by Bror Yngve Sjöstedt